Men in Black: International (stylized as MIB: International in promotional material) is a 2019 American science fiction action comedy film directed by F. Gary Gray and written by Art Marcum and Matt Holloway. It is the fourth installment in the Men in Black film series, serving as a stand-alone sequel set in the same universe as the previous films; it is the first film in the series to not feature Will Smith or Tommy Lee Jones as the main characters. It is loosely based on the Malibu/Marvel comic book series of the same name by Lowell Cunningham. The film stars Chris Hemsworth, Tessa Thompson, Kumail Nanjiani, Rebecca Ferguson, Rafe Spall, Laurent and Larry Bourgeois, and Liam Neeson. Emma Thompson reprises her role from the third film, while Tim Blaney returns to voice Frank the Pug from the first two installments. The film follows the Men in Black taking on its biggest threat: a mole in the agency.

Talks of a fourth Men in Black film began after the release of Men in Black 3 in 2012. In February 2018, Hemsworth signed on to lead a spin-off while Gray was hired to direct, and Thompson joined the cast the following month. Filming took place in New York City, Morocco, Italy, and London from July to October 2018.

Men in Black: International was theatrically released in the United States on June 14, 2019, by Sony Pictures Releasing under its Columbia Pictures label. The film was a box office disappointment and received generally negative reviews, which criticized the "lackluster action and forgettable plot", although the chemistry between Hemsworth and Thompson was praised.

Plot

In 1996 Brooklyn, Molly Wright as a young girl witnesses her parents being neuralyzed by agents of Men in Black after they see an alien in their home. Molly helps the alien escape, avoiding neuralyzation herself. Twenty-three years later, rejected from government agencies due to her "delusions" regarding alien life, Molly tracks down an alien landing and follows MIB agents to their headquarters in New York City. Caught entering the agency, Molly makes an impression on Agent O after revealing she had bypassed neuralyzation, arguing that her obsessive search for them makes her 'perfect' for the job and she has no life outside her search for the agency. She is awarded probationary agent status as "Agent M" and assigned to the organization's London branch.

There, M meets T as High, head of the London branch, and Agent H. M learns that H and T (before he was High) fought off an invasion of the Hive – a parasitic race who invade planets by merging with the DNA of the conquered species – at the Eiffel Tower in 2016, using a wormhole included in the original migration to Earth; H has since become unconcerned with his duties and only keeping his job due to High T covering for him. M arranges for herself to be assigned to assist H in his meeting with Vungus the Ugly, his close friend and alien royalty. During their night out with Vungus, they are accosted by mysterious alien twins able to manifest as pure energy. They fatally injure Vungus, who gives M a strange crystal before he dies, claiming that H has changed since they last met and cannot be trusted. M points out that few people knew Vungus' location, and he was likely betrayed by one of the agents present when High T assigned H to guard him. Nervous at the possibility of a traitor within MiB, High T assigns Agents C and M to investigate while H is demoted to desk duty, with evidence suggesting that the twins had DNA traces of the Hive.

H convinces M to join him in following a lead to Marrakesh, where they recover "Pawny", the last survivor of a small group of aliens attacked by the Twins. Pawny pledges loyalty to M, and they are trapped by MiB agents coordinated by C, who recovered video footage of Vungus passing the crystal to M and believes she is the traitor. With the aid of alien contacts Nasr and Bassam, H escapes with M and Pawny on a rocket-powered bike, and they learn that Vungus’ crystal is a weapon powered by a compressed blue giant. As they repair the damaged bike, Bassam steals the weapon and takes it to Riza Stavros, an alien arms dealer and H's ex-girlfriend. Traveling to Riza's island fortress, the trio attempts to infiltrate the base, but is caught by Riza and her bodyguard Luca Brasi. Luca, the alien M rescued as a child, returns the favor by allowing them to leave with the weapon while he keeps Riza contained. The three are cornered by the Twins, who are killed by High T and a group of agents.

Although the case appears concluded, H and M review the evidence and realize that the Twins' phrases suggest they required the weapon to use against the Hive, especially when the only evidence of Hive DNA was provided by High T. They discover High T has deleted the case file and not sent the weapon to evidence, and has gone to the Eiffel Tower with the weapon. C also realizes High T's deception and allows H and M to follow High T to the Eiffel Tower. As they travel to the reopened wormhole, M's questioning of H's memory of the Hive's defeat reveals he was neuralyzed when the Hive converted T into one of their own during the battle. The High T/Hive hybrid activates a wormhole to draw the Hive to Earth, but H draws out High T's true personality long enough for M to use the weapon at full capacity to destroy High T and the Hive infestation trying to reach Earth.

With the truth of High T's conversion exposed, Agent O joins H and M in Paris, where she grants M full agent status and appoints H probationary head of MiB's London branch.

Cast 
 Chris Hemsworth as Henry / Agent H, a top agent and later probationary head of the MIB UK branch
 Tessa Thompson as Molly Wright / Agent M, a rookie MIB recruit and probationary agent assigned to the UK branch
 Mandeiya Flory as Young Molly
 Liam Neeson as High T, the longtime legendary head of the MIB UK branch
 Kumail Nanjiani (voice) as Pawny, a tiny alien warrior that H and M befriend
 Rafe Spall as Agent C, a senior MIB agent in the UK branch who is skeptical of H's past
 Rebecca Ferguson as Riza Stavros, an alien intergalactic arms dealer and H's ex-girlfriend
 Laurent and Larry Bourgeois as the Twins, a shape-shifting alien duo seeking a dangerous artifact
 Larry Bourgeois also portrays the human that the Twins kill and base their appearance on
 Emma Thompson as Agent O, the head of the MIB US branch who operates out of New York
 Kayvan Novak as Vungus the Ugly, a member of an alien royal family and friend of H
 Kayvan Novak also portrays Nasr and voices Bassam
 Annie Burkin as Nerlene
 Tim Blaney as Frank the Pug (voice)
 Spencer Wilding as Luca Brasi, an alien mobster who acts as personal bodyguard to Riza Stavros
 Marcy Harriell and Inny Clemons cameo as Molly's parents in a flashback
 Thom Fountain and Drew Massey as the Worm Guys (voices), worm-like aliens that work for MIB
 Stephen Wight as Guy / Stupid guy in a call center next to Molly

Production
In February 2018, it was reported that Chris Hemsworth would star in the film, set to be directed by F. Gary Gray. The following month, Tessa Thompson joined the cast. In May 2018, it was reported that Liam Neeson was in talks to star in the film as the head of the UK branch of the agency. The film was written by Art Marcum and Matt Holloway and produced by Laurie MacDonald and Walter Parkes. In June 2018, Kumail Nanjiani, Rafe Spall, and Les Twins (Laurent and Larry Bourgeois) were added to the cast. Danny Elfman, who scored the first three Men in Black films, returned to compose the score for the film alongside Chris Bacon. Steven Spielberg executively produced, as he did for the first three MIB entries, along with Barry Sonnenfeld, who directed all the previous films.

Principal photography on the film began on July 9, 2018, at Leavesden Studios and on location in London, and continued in Marrakesh such as the Jemaa el-Fnaa and El Badi Palace, Ischia and the Aragonese Castle, and New York City. Emma Thompson was announced as reprising her role as Agent O in the film later that month. In August 2018, Rebecca Ferguson joined the cast of the film. On October 17, Hemsworth confirmed that filming had wrapped.

Visual effects for the film were provided by Double Negative, and supervised by Alessandro Ongaro with the help of Rodeo FX, Sony Pictures Imageworks and Method Studios.

The film went through a troubled production due to frequent clashes between director Gray and producer Parkes, which started when the executive overseeing the project, Sony's executive vice president of production David Beaubaire, exited the studio in the summer of 2018, and was not replaced. An early draft of the script, which Sony initially praised, and which received the attention of stars Hemsworth and Thompson, had an edgier tone than the finished film; it featured sociopolitical commentary on the current debate surrounding immigration. The main antagonists were to be an alien music group inspired by the Beatles, with the four members merging into one villain during the climax. Parkes, who had final cut on the film, had a heavy hand in overseeing rewrites during pre-production and filming. Parkes' new script pages stripped away the early draft's modern sensibilities, and were newly sent, daily, to Hemsworth and Thompson, who were both so confused that they hired their own dialogue writers. Parkes not only dictated rewrites but stepped in on directing duties, although no Directors Guild of America rules were said to have been violated. Gray tried to exit the production several times but was convinced to stay by Sony. Parkes and Gray also clashed over the color-correction process during post-production. The studio tested two cuts—one put together by Gray, the other by Parkes—with the version by Parkes being chosen as the theatrical cut.

Release

Theatrical
The film was originally going to be released on May 17, 2019, but was pushed back to June 14, 2019. The film had its world premiere in New York City on June 11, 2019.

Marketing
Some press estimated that Sony would spend around $120 million on prints and advertising for the film, a figure considered to be on the "lower end" for a tentpole feature. They also partnered with several companies to promote it, including Lexus, Hamilton Watches, Zaxby's, Dave & Buster's and Booking.com, for about estimated $75 million worth of advertising.

Lexus had a partnership with Sony Pictures to use their vehicles for the film, the RC and the RX, all in their F Sport variants. The motor company also designed an alien-looking spaceship in the same body of the RC model.

Home media
The film was released on Digital HD on August 20, 2019, and on Blu-ray, Ultra HD Blu-ray, and DVD on September 3, 2019, in the United States.

Reception

Box office
Men in Black: International cost $94–110 million to make plus another estimated $120 million for marketing in addition to ancillary market expenses. It was estimated that the film would need  to gross $220–300 million worldwide in order to break even.
The film grossed $80 million in the United States and Canada, and $173.9 million in other territories, for a worldwide total of $253.9 million, or just about break even. 

In the United States and Canada, Men in Black: International was released alongside Shaft, as well as the wide expansion of Late Night, and was projected to gross $30–40 million from 4,224 theaters in its opening weekend. The film made $10.4 million on its first day, including $3.1 million from Thursday night previews. It went on to debut to $30 million, topping the weekend box office but coming in below expectations. This debut made it the first film in the series not to open above $50 million. The underwhelming opening was blamed on the dated franchise, poor critical reviews and audience anticipation for other, upcoming big releases Toy Story 4 and Spider-Man: Far From Home. The film fell 64% in its second weekend to $10.7 million, finishing fourth, and then made $6.7 million in its third weekend, finishing in sixth.

Worldwide, the film was released concurrently with the United States in 56 additional countries and was projected to gross $70–85 million, for a worldwide debut of $100–115 million. It ended up making $73.7 million overseas and $102.2 million globally, finishing first in 36 of the markets. It underperformed in Asian countries like China ($26.3 million) and South Korea ($4.9 million) due to poor word-of-mouth, similar to the U.S., although it finished first in Mexico ($3.9 million), Brazil ($1.8 million), Russia ($5.1 million), the UK ($3.4 million), Australia ($2.6 million) and France ($2.5 million).

Critical response
The website's critical consensus reads, "Amiable yet forgettable, MIB International grinds its stars' substantial chemistry through the gears of a franchise running low on reasons to continue." On Metacritic, the film has a weighted average score of 38 out of 100, based on 51 critics, indicating "generally unfavorable reviews." Audiences polled by CinemaScore gave the film an average grade of "B" on an A+ to F scale, the lowest score of the franchise, while those at PostTrak gave it a 72% overall positive score and a 46% "definite recommend."

Peter Bradshaw of The Guardian called it "Men in Black, making another intensely tiresome and pointless reappearance," and gave the film 1 out of 5 stars. Peter DeBruge of Variety said that "The connection between Tessa Thompson and Hemsworth is what saves the day, not anything their characters do onscreen" and called the film itself "amusing, if uneven." Michael Phillips of the Chicago Tribune gave the film 2.5 out of 4 stars, writing: "Men in Black: International isn't bad; it's an improvement over Men in Black II (2002) and Men in Black 3 (2012), sequels that even its makers may have forgotten. As a species we appear destined to revisit this basic concept and renew the hunt for fresh variations on the zingy, disarming first picture, which brought the Lowell Cunningham comics to the screen so shrewdly and well in 1997."

References

External links
 
 

2010s buddy comedy films
2010s science fiction comedy films
2019 science fiction action films
2019 3D films
2019 films
2010s monster movies
Amblin Entertainment films
American action comedy films
American buddy comedy films
American science fiction comedy films
American science fiction action films
American sequel films
Columbia Pictures films
Tencent Pictures films
Films about extraterrestrial life
Films based on American comics
Films directed by F. Gary Gray
Films scored by Danny Elfman
Films set in 1996
Films set in 2016
Films set in 2019
Films set in Italy
Films set in London
Films set in New York City
Films set in Paris
Films set in deserts
Films set on islands
Films shot in Italy
Films shot in London
Films shot in Morocco
Films shot in New York City
Films shot at Warner Bros. Studios, Leavesden
Films with screenplays by Art Marcum and Matt Holloway
Men in Black (franchise)
2019 action comedy films
Films produced by Walter F. Parkes
2010s English-language films
2010s American films